Surisan Station is a railway station on Seoul Subway Line 4. It is between Sanbon Station and Daeyami Station. Opened on July 18, 2003, Surisan station's name comes from Surisan, which is not too close to the station. It was also made to reflect the opinions of local residents.

Station layout

References

Metro stations in Gunpo
Seoul Metropolitan Subway stations
Railway stations opened in 2003